Hell Songs is the second studio album by American rock band Daughters, released on August 8, 2006, through Hydra Head Records. The album sees Daughters changing their style musically as well as vocally; there is less screaming vocals used.

Track listing

The Japanese imported edition features twelve live bonus tracks under the sub-title "Live at CBGB"

Personnel

Daughters
 Alexis Marshall – vocals
 Nicholas Andrew Sadler – guitar
 Brent Frattini – guitar
 Samuel M. Walker – bass
 Jon Syverson – drums

Additional musicians
 Ryan McGuire – double bass on "Providence by Gaslight"
 Forbes Graham – trumpet, euphonium on "Providence by Gaslight"
 Mia Matsumiya – Violin on "Providence by Gaslight"Production and recording
 Andrew Schneider – production, mixing
 Daughters – production
 Nick Zampiello – mastering
 Devin Charette - additional engineering, assistance
 Ethan Dussalt - help
 Bob Maloney - help
 Bo Dixon - help

Artwork and design
 Alexis Marshall – art direction
 Steven Vallot – album art
 Aaron Turner – album construction

References

2006 albums
Daughters (band) albums
Hydra Head Records albums